Stirnberg is a mountain of Bavaria, Germany.

Mountains of Bavaria
Mountains and hills of the Rhön